The 1933–34 season was Stoke City's 34th season in the Football League and the 20th in the First Division.

Now back in the First Division for the first time since the 1922–23 season Stoke were looking to establish themselves amongst the nation's elite. However, they struggled and by Christmas they were in the relegation places, but only three defeats in their last twelve matches saw Stoke survive comfortably and finished the season in 12th place with 41 points.

In the FA Cup Stoke advanced to the quarter final and played Manchester City where the largest attendance at an English football match was recorded with 84,569 packed into Maine Road.

Season review

League
After a decade out of the First Division, Stoke were back in the top-flight for the first time since 1922. The atmosphere around the club was first-class with the directors re-signing the entire first team squad for the 1933–34 season. Consolidation was the obvious aim, but playing in the First Division was a totally different challenge and the reality of taking on better sides soon hit home.

Stoke struggled and by Christmas they found themselves in the relegation zone and looked to be heading back to the Second Division. It was at this juncture that Tom Mather made two vital decisions, firstly he signed Arthur Tutin a right-half from Aldershot for £500 and then he recalled Bob McGrory from the reserves at the age of 40. McGrory's presence boosted the sides morale and Stoke climbed up the table, eventually finishing 12th place. During the second half of the season they picked up more points than any other team with the exception of the top two Arsenal and Huddersfield Town. Stanley Matthews, never regarded for his goal scoring scored 15 goals, his best tally of his famous career.

FA Cup
In the FA Cup Stoke advanced past Bradford Park Avenue, Blackpool and Chelsea before meeting Manchester City at Maine Road in the quarter Final. Man City won the tie 1–0 thanks to a goal from legendary striker Eric Brook. An attendance of 84,569 packed into Maine Road, the largest attendance at an English football match.

Final league table

Results
Stoke's score comes first

Legend

Football League First Division

FA Cup

Squad statistics

References

Stoke City F.C. seasons
Stoke